The 2013–14 Philadelphia 76ers season was the 75th season of the franchise, the 65th in the National Basketball Association (NBA), and the 51st in Philadelphia. The season was notable for the 76ers tying Cleveland's NBA record for most consecutive losses with 26, a streak that started with a 99–125 loss to the Atlanta Hawks on January 31 and ended with a 123–98 win over the Detroit Pistons on March 29. They were 14–31 after 45 games and finished with 5 wins and 32 losses in their last 37 games.

Rookie Michael Carter-Williams enjoyed a successful rookie season, earning Rookie of the Year honors at the end of the season. It was the only full season that Carter-Williams would spend in a Sixers uniform as he was traded to the Milwaukee Bucks midway through his sophomore year.

Key dates
 June 27: The 2013 NBA draft took place at the Barclays Center in Brooklyn, New York.
 July 1: 2013 NBA Free Agency begins.

Draft picks

Roster

Pre-season

|- style="background:#cfc;"
| 1
| October 6
| @ Bilbao
| 
| Evan Turner (25)
| James Anderson (7)
| Michael Carter-Williams (6)
| Bizkaia Arena at the BEC13,538
| 1–0
|- style="background:#fcc;"
| 2
| October 8
| Oklahoma City
| 
| Tony Wroten (20)
| Spencer Hawes (9)
| Anderson, Young, Turner, Carter-Williams, Morris (4)
| Phones 4u Arena13,472
| 1–1
|- style="background:#cfc;"
| 3
| October 11
| Boston
| 
| Thaddeus Young (20)
| Turner & Allen (9)
| Carter-Williams & Wroten (6)
| Bob Carpenter Center4,646
| 2–1
|- style="background:#fcc;"
| 4
| October 14
| Brooklyn
| 
| Evan Turner (23)
| Turner, Young, Hawes (5)
| Turner & Carter-Williams (4)
| Wells Fargo Center6,315
| 2–2
|- style="background:#fcc;"
| 5
| October 17
| @ Charlotte
| 
| Tony Wroten (20)
| Hollis Thompson (10)
| Michael Carter-Williams (5)
| Time Warner Cable Arena16,283
| 2–3
|- style="background:#fcc;"
| 6
| October 21
| @ Cleveland
| 
| Hawes & Anderson (17)
| Spencer Hawes (12)
| Turner, Hawes, Carter-Williams (3)
| Schottenstein Center11,276
| 2–4
|- style="background:#fcc;"
| 7
| October 23
| Minnesota
| 
| James Anderson (23)
| Evan Turner (10)
| Evan Turner (5)
| Wells Fargo Center7,938
| 2–5

Regular season

Season standings

Game log

|- style="background:#cfc;"
| 1
| October 30
| Miami
| 
| Evan Turner (26)
| Spencer Hawes (9)
| Michael Carter-Williams (12)
| Wells Fargo Center19,523
| 1–0

|- style="background:#cfc;"
| 2
| November 1
| @ Washington
| 
| Thaddeus Young (29)
| Spencer Hawes (14)
| James Anderson (6)
| Verizon Center17,160
| 2–0
|- style="background:#cfc;"
| 3
| November 2
| Chicago
| 
| Michael Carter-Williams (26)
| Spencer Hawes (11)
| Michael Carter-Williams (10)
| Wells Fargo Center15,782
| 3–0
|- style="background:#fcc;"
| 4
| November 4
| Golden State
| 
| Turner & Carter-Williams (18)
| Hawes & Allen (8)
| Darius Morris (5)
| Wells Fargo Center11,089
| 3–1
|- style="background:#fcc;"
| 5
| November 6
| Washington
| 
| Evan Turner (24)
| Spencer Hawes (13)
| Michael Carter-Williams (7)
| Wells Fargo Center10,117
| 3–2
|- style="background:#cfc;"
| 6
| November 8
| Cleveland
| 
| Evan Turner (22)
| Evan Turner (10)
| Michael Carter-Williams (6)
| Wells Fargo Center15,219
| 4–2
|- style="background:#fcc;"
| 7
| November 9
| @ Cleveland
| 
| Evan Turner (31)
| Spencer Hawes (11)
| Michael Carter-Williams (13)
| Quicken Loans Arena20,562
| 4–3
|- style="background:#fcc;"
| 8
| November 11
| San Antonio
| 
| Evan Turner (20)
| Spencer Hawes (13)
| Carter-Williams & Morris (4)
| Wells Fargo Center12,424
| 4–4
|- style="background:#cfc;"
| 9
| November 13
| Houston
| 
| James Anderson (36)
| Tony Wroten (10)
| Tony Wroten (11)
| Wells Fargo Center11,671
| 5–4
|- style="background:#fcc;"
| 10
| November 15
| @ Atlanta
| 
| Evan Turner (27)
| Spencer Hawes (12)
| Tony Wroten (6)
| Philips Arena12,070
| 5–5
|- style="background:#fcc;"
| 11
| November 16
| @ New Orleans
| 
| Darius Morris (20)
| Brandon Davies (8)
| Spencer Hawes (3)
| New Orleans Arena16,659
| 5–6
|- style="background:#fcc;"
| 12
| November 18
| @ Dallas
| 
| Evan Turner (26)
| Young & Hawes (11)
| Evan Turner (7)
| American Airlines Center19,790
| 5–7
|- style="background:#fcc;"
| 13
| November 20
| Toronto
| 
| Spencer Hawes (28)
| Hawes & Turner (10)
| Michael Carter-Williams (6)
| Wells Fargo Center10,787
| 5–8
|- style="background:#cfc;"
| 14
| November 22
| Milwaukee
| 
| Evan Turner (27)
| Spencer Hawes (12)
| Michael Carter-Williams (11)
| Wells Fargo Center13,588
| 6–8
|- style="background:#fcc;"
| 15
| November 23
| @ Indiana
| 
| Michael Carter-Williams (29)
| Evan Turner (11)
| Michael Carter-Williams (3)
| Bankers Life Fieldhouse18,165
| 6–9
|- style="background:#fcc;"
| 16
| November 27
| @ Orlando
| 
| Thaddeus Young (26)
| Evan Turner (11)
| Evan Turner (8)
| Amway Center15,839
| 6–10
|- style="background:#fcc;"
| 17
| November 29
| New Orleans
| 
| Tony Wroten (24)
| Thaddeus Young (12)
| Michael Carter-Williams (10)
| Wells Fargo Center17,807
| 6–11

|- style="background:#fcc;"
| 18
| December 1
| @ Detroit
| 
| Thaddeus Young (24)
| Spencer Hawes (9)
| Michael Carter-Williams (6)
| Palace of Auburn Hills14,107
| 6–12
|- style="background:#cfc;"
| 19
| December 3
| Orlando
| 
| Michael Carter-Williams (27)
| Carter-Williams & Young (12)
| Michael Carter-Williams (10)
| Wells Fargo Center10,061
| 7–12
|- style="background:#fcc;"
| 20
| December 6
| @ Charlotte
| 
| Tony Wroten (21)
| Spencer Hawes (13)
| Tony Wroten (9)
| Time Warner Cable Arena14,088
| 7–13
|- style="background:#fcc;"
| 21
| December 7
| Denver
| 
| Tony Wroten (20)
| Hollis Thompson (9)
| Evan Turner (5)
| Wells Fargo Center13,113
| 7–14
|- style="background:#fcc;"
| 22
| December 9
| L.A. Clippers
| 
| Evan Turner (25)
| Thaddeus Young (11)
| Tony Wroten (7)
| Wells Fargo Center12,355
| 7–15
|- style="background:#fcc;"
| 23
| December 11
| @ Minnesota
| 
| Spencer Hawes (20)
| Evan Turner (8)
| Lorenzo Brown (6)
| Target Center13,450
| 7–16
|- style="background:#fcc;"
| 24
| December 13
| @ Toronto
| 
| Tony Wroten (23)
| Evan Turner (10)
| Tony Wroten (5)
| Air Canada Centre17,133
| 7–17
|- style="background:#fcc;"
| 25
| December 14
| Portland
| 
| Tony Wroten (18)
| Lavoy Allen (8)
| Tony Wroten (7)
| Wells Fargo Center10,189
| 7–18
|- style="background:#fcc;"
| 26
| December 16
| @ Brooklyn
| 
| James Anderson (17)
| Lavoy Allen (8)
| Evan Turner (5)
| Barclays Center16,733
| 7–19
|- style="background:#cfc;"
| 27
| December 20
| Brooklyn
| 
| Evan Turner (29)
| Evan Turner (10)
| Michael Carter-Williams (10)
| Wells Fargo Center15,267
| 8–19
|- style="background:#fcc;"
| 28
| December 21
| @ Milwaukee
| 
| Thaddeus Young (30)
| Spencer Hawes (11)
| Michael Carter-Williams (12)
| BMO Harris Bradley Center14,541
| 8–20
|- style="background:#fcc;"
| 29
| December 28
| @ Phoenix
| 
| Thaddeus Young (30)
| Thaddeus Young (10)
| Michael Carter-Williams (6)
| US Airways Center15,623
| 8–21
|- style="background:#cfc;"
| 30
| December 29
| @ L.A. Lakers
| 
| Thaddeus Young (25)
| Thaddeus Young (9)
| Evan Turner (6)
| Staples Center18,997
| 9–21

|- style="background:#cfc;"
| 31
| January 1
| @ Denver
| 
| Evan Turner (23)
| Thaddeus Young (10)
| Michael Carter-Williams Evan Turner (6)
| Pepsi Center16,006
| 10–21
|- style="background:#cfc;"
| 32
| January 2
| @ Sacramento
| 
| Thaddeus Young (28)
| Evan Turner (10)
| Evan Turner (6)
| Sleep Train Arena16,259
| 11–21
|- style="background:#cfc;"
| 33
| January 4
| @ Portland
| 
| Thaddeus Young (30)
| Michael Carter-Williams Spencer Hawes (8)
| Spencer Hawes (7)
| Moda Center20,004
| 12–21
|- style="background:#fcc;"
| 34
| January 6
| Minnesota
| 
| Thaddeus Young (20)
| James Anderson (7)
| Michael Carter-Williams (7)
| Wells Fargo Center10,736
| 12–22
|- style="background:#fcc;"
| 35
| January 7
| @ Cleveland
| 
| Michael Carter-Williams (33)
| Michael Carter-Williams (6)
| Michael Carter-Williams (5)
| Quicken Loans Arena13,344
| 12–23
|- style="background:#fcc;"
| 36
| January 10
| Detroit
| 
| Thaddeus Young (22)
| Spencer Hawes (10)
| Spencer Hawes (6)
| Wells Fargo Center13,742
| 12–24
|- style="background:#fcc;"
| 37
| January 11
| New York
| 
| James Anderson & Spencer Hawes (17)
| three players (7)
| Michael Carter-Williams (7)
| Wells Fargo Center16,278
| 12–25
|- style="background:#cfc;"
| 38
| January 15
| Charlotte
| 
| Evan Turner (23)
| Spencer Hawes (14)
| Michael Carter-Williams & Spencer Hawes (7)
| Wells Fargo Center10,106
| 13–25
|- style="background:#fcc;"
| 39
| January 17
| Miami
| 
| Tony Wroten (13)
| Spencer Hawes (10)
| Spencer Hawes (4)
| Wells Fargo Center19,286
| 13–26
|- style="background:#fcc;"
| 40
| January 18
| @ Chicago
| 
| Thaddeus Young (12)
| James Anderson & Dewayne Dedmon (7)
| Michael Carter-Williams (5)
| United Center21,710
| 13–27
|- style="background:#fcc;"
| 41
| January 20
| @ Washington
| 
| Michael Carter-Williams (31)
| Spencer Hawes (16)
| Michael Carter-Williams (5)
| Verizon Center18,650
| 13–28
|- style="background:#cfc;"
| 42
| January 22
| @ New York
| 
| Evan Turner (34)
| Michael Carter-Williams (12)
| Michael Carter-Williams & Spencer Hawes (7)
| Madison Square Garden19,812
| 14–28
|- style="background:#fcc;"
| 43
| January 24
| Toronto
| 
| Michael Carter-Williams (20)
| Spencer Hawes (12)
| James Anderson (5)
| Wells Fargo Center11,489
| 14–29
|- style="background:#fcc;"
| 44
| January 25
| Oklahoma City
| 
| James Anderson (19)
| Thaddeus Young (10) 
| Evan Turner (6)
| Wells Fargo Center19,217
| 14–30
|- style="background:#fcc;"
| 45
| January 27
| Phoenix
| 
| Michael Carter-Williams (22)
| Spencer Hawes (9)
| Michael Carter-Williams (11)
| Wells Fargo Center10,793
| 14–31
|- style="background:#cfc;"
| 46
| January 29
| @ Boston
| 
| Spencer Hawes (20)
| Spencer Hawes (8)
| Evan Turner (8)
| TD Garden18,624
| 15–31
|- style="background:#fcc;"
| 47
| January 31
| Atlanta
| 
| Thaddeus Young (29)
| Lavoy Allen (10)
| Michael Carter-Williams (5)
| Wells Fargo Center14,702
| 15–32

|- style="background:#fcc;"
| 48
| February 1
| @ Detroit
| 
| Tony Wroten (18)
| Spencer Hawes (8)
| Tony Wroten (5)
| Palace of Auburn Hills16,649
| 15–33
|- style="background:#fcc;"
| 49
| February 3
| @ Brooklyn
| 
| Michael Carter-Williams (21)
| Spencer Hawes (8)
| Spencer Hawes (6)
| Barclays Center16,727
| 15–34
|- style="background:#fcc;"
| 50
| February 5
| Boston
| 
| Thaddeus Young (20)
| Spencer Hawes (14)
| Michael Carter-Williams (6)
| Wells Fargo Center10,267
| 15–35
|- style="background:#fcc;"
| 51
| February 7
| L.A. Lakers
| 
| Tony Wroten (16)
| Spencer Hawes (11)
| Michael Carter-Williams (7)
| Wells Fargo Center15,211
| 15–36
|- style="background:#fcc;"
| 52
| February 9
| @ L.A. Clippers
| 
| Tony Wroten (21)
| Thaddeus Young (11)
| Michael Carter-Williams (5)
| Staples Center19,157
| 15–37
|- style="background:#fcc;"
| 53
| February 10
| @ Golden State
| 
| Michael Carter-Williams (24)
| Spencer Hawes (6)
| Spencer Hawes (4)
| Oracle Arena19,596
| 15–38
|- style="background:#fcc;"
| 54
| February 12
| @ Utah
| 
| Evan Turner (21)
| Spencer Hawes (11)
| Michael Carter-Williams (8)
| EnergySolutions Arena19,368
| 15–39
|- align="center"
|colspan="9" bgcolor="#bbcaff"|All-Star Break
|- style="background:#fcc;"
| 55
| February 18
| Cleveland
| 
| Young & Carter-Williams (15)
| Thaddeus Young (9)
| Evan Turner (6)
| Wells Fargo Center12,904
| 15–40
|- style="background:#fcc;"
| 56
| February 21
| Dallas
| 
| Thaddeus Young (30)
| Thaddeus Young(13)
| Michael Carter-Williams(6)
| Wells Fargo Center14,928
| 15–41
|- style="background:#fcc;"
| 57
| February 24
| Milwaukee
| 
| Thaddeus Young (28)
| Arnett Moultrie (8)
| Thaddeus Young (7)
| Wells Fargo Center12,216
| 15–42
|- style="background:#fcc;"
| 58
| February 26
| Orlando
| 
| Thaddeus Young (19)
| Hollis Thompson (7)
| Michael Carter-Williams(4)
| Wells Fargo Center12,817
| 15–43

|- style="background:#fcc;"
| 59
| March 1
| Washington
| 
| Tony Wroten (19)
| Byron Mullens (7)
| Michael Carter-Williams(7)
| Wells Fargo Center20,856
| 15–44
|- style="background:#fcc;"
| 60
| March 2
| @ Orlando
| 
| Thaddeus Young (29)
| Michael Carter-Williams(11)
| Michael Carter-Williams(6)
| Amway Center16,704
| 15–45
|- style="background:#fcc;"
| 61
| March 4
| @ Oklahoma City
| 
| James Anderson (20)
| Varnado & Mullens (6)
| Michael Carter-Williams(5)
| Chesapeake Energy Arena18,203
| 15–46
|- style="background:#fcc;"
| 62
| March 8
| Utah
| 
| Tony Wroten (30)
| Michael Carter-Williams(7)
| Michael Carter-Williams(9)
| Wells Fargo Center13,569
| 15–47
|- style="background:#fcc;"
| 63
| March 10
| @ New York
| 
| Wroten & Carter-Williams (23)
| Michael Carter-Williams (13)
| Michael Carter-Williams (10)
| Madison Square Garden19,812
| 15–48
|- style="background:#fcc;"
| 64
| March 12
| Sacramento
| 
| Henry Sims (20)
| Henry Sims (10)
| Sims, Anderson & Young (3)
| Wells Fargo Center11,109
| 15–49
|- style="background:#fcc;"
| 65
| March 14
| Indiana
| 
| Thaddeus Young (25)
| Michael Carter-Williams(9)
| Thaddeus Young (10)
| Wells Fargo Center14,754
| 15–50
|- style="background:#fcc;"
| 66
| March 15
| Memphis
| 
| Michael Carter-Williams (23)
| Michael Carter-Williams (8)
| Carter-Williams & Young (3)
| Wells Fargo Center15,164
| 15–51
|- style="background:#fcc;"
| 67
| March 17
| @ Indiana
| 
| Thaddeus Young (23)
| Michael Carter-Williams(13)
| Michael Carter-Williams(5)
| Bankers Life Fieldhouse18,165
| 15–52
|- style="background:#fcc;"
| 68
| March 19
| Chicago
| 
| Thaddeus Young (24)
| Michael Carter-Williams (9)
| Wroten & Carter-Williams (7)
| Wells Fargo Center13,222
| 15–53
|- style="background:#fcc;"
| 69
| March 21
| New York
| 
| Michael Carter-Williams (22)
| Sims & Carter-Williams (13)
| Michael Carter-Williams (9)
| Wells Fargo Center12,745
| 15–54
|- style="background:#fcc;"
| 70
| March 22
| @ Chicago
| 
| Thaddeus Young (28)
| Henry Sims (15)
| Michael Carter-Williams (6)
| United Center21,799
| 15–55
|- style="background:#fcc;"
| 71
| March 24
| @ San Antonio
| 
| Sims & Young (17)
| Byron Mullens (8)
| Henry Sims (7)
| AT&T Center17,798
| 15–56
|- style="background:#fcc;"
| 72
| March 27
| @ Houston
| 
| James Anderson (30)
| Thaddeus Young (9)
| Michael Carter-Williams (10)
| Toyota Center18,334
| 15–57
|- style="background:#cfc;"
| 73
| March 29
| Detroit
| 
| Young & Carter-Williams (21)
| Sims & Carter-Williams (7)
| Tony Wroten (9)
| Wells Fargo Center17,438
| 16–57
|- style="background:#fcc;"
| 74
| March 31
| @ Atlanta
| 
| Thaddeus Young (23)
| Michael Carter-Williams (9)
| Varnado & Carter-Williams (9)
| Philips Arena11,096
| 16–58

|- style="background:#fcc;"
| 75
| April 2
| Charlotte
| 
| Michael Carter-Williams (22)
| Michael Carter-Williams (7)
| Young, Varnado & Wroten (4)
| Wells Fargo Center12,136
| 16–59
|- style="background:#cfc;"
| 76
| April 4
| @ Boston
| 
| Sims & Carter-Williams (24)
| Henry Sims (9)
| Michael Carter-Williams (6)
| TD Garden18,624
| 17–59
|- style="background:#fcc;"
| 77
| April 5
| Brooklyn
| 
| Thaddeus Young (20)
| Henry Sims (11)
| Michael Carter-Williams (11)
| Wells Fargo Center16,133
| 17–60
|- style="background:#fcc;"
| 78
| April 9
| @ Toronto
| 
| Henry Sims (22)
| Michael Carter-Williams (9)
| Michael Carter-Williams (8)
| Air Canada Centre18,789
| 17–61
|- style="background:#fcc;"
| 79
| April 11
| @ Memphis
| 
| Young & Wroten (18)
| Sims, Carter-Williams & Davies (6)
| Michael Carter-Williams (5)
| FedExForum17,456
| 17–62
|- style="background:#fcc;"
| 80
| April 12
| @ Charlotte
| 
| Michael Carter-Williams (23)
| Carter-Williams & Mullens (7)
| Michael Carter-Williams (8)
| Time Warner Cable Arena17,140
| 17–63
|- style="background:#cfc;"
| 81
| April 14
| Boston
| 
| Michael Carter-Williams (21)
| Michael Carter-Williams (14)
| Thaddeus Young (7)
| Wells Fargo Center17,822
| 18–63
|- style="background:#cfc;"
| 82
| April 16
| @ Miami
| 
| Thaddeus Young (20)
| Thaddeus Young (9)
| Tony Wroten (6)
| American Airlines Arena20,350
| 19–63

Notes

References

Philadelphia 76ers seasons
Philadelphia 76ers
Philadelphia
Philadelphia